A secondary carbon is a carbon atom bound to two other carbon atoms. For this reason, secondary carbon atoms are found in all hydrocarbons having at least three carbon atoms. In unbranched alkanes, the inner carbon atoms are always secondary carbon atoms (see figure).

References 

Chemical nomenclature
Organic chemistry